Joseph Stalin (1878–1953) was a Bolshevik revolutionary and the second leader of the Soviet Union from the mid-1920s until his death in 1953.

Stalin may also refer to:

Stalin (name), a given name and surname
Stalin (1992 film), a telefilm starring Robert Duvall
Stalin (2006 film), an Indian film starring Chiranjeevi
Stalin (Radzinsky book), a 1997 biography by Edvard Radzinsky
Stalin: An Appraisal of the Man and His Influence, a 1946 biography by Leon Trotsky
Stalin (Scheme implementation), an implementation of the Scheme programming language
The Stalin, a Japanese punk rock band
Qyteti Stalin, a city in Albania named after Joseph Stalin, now and previously Kuçovë
Donetsk, Ukraine, a city formerly known as Stalin
Roy Stalin, a character from the film Better Off Dead

See also
Iosef Stalin tank, a Soviet tank
Iosif Stalin class passenger ship
Iosif Stalin class steamship
List of places named after Joseph Stalin
Sibir (1937 icebreaker)
Stalinism
Steamer Tovarich Stalin